The Rural Municipality of Heart's Hill No. 352 is a rural municipality (RM) in the Canadian province of Saskatchewan within Census Division No. 13 and  Division No. 6. Located in the west-central portion of the province, it is adjacent to the Alberta boundary.

History 
The RM of Heart's Hill No. 352 incorporated as a rural municipality on November 15, 1910.

Geography

Communities and localities 
The following unincorporated communities are within the RM.

Localities
 Cactus Lake
 Cosine
 Hearts Hill

Demographics 

Government 
The RM of Heart's Hill No. 352 is governed by an elected municipal council and an appointed administrator that meets on the first Thursday after the first Monday of every month. The reeve of the RM is Gordon Stang while its administrator is Calvin Giggs. The RM's office is located in Luseland.

Transportation
Highway 771
Highway 317

See also
For Heart Hill in south-east Saskatchewan, see Moose Mountain Upland

References 

H

Division No. 13, Saskatchewan